Reading Depot, commonly referred to as Reading outer station, was a train station in Reading, Pennsylvania, that served as a major hub between Philadelphia and Williamsport, Pennsylvania. Built in 1874, the station closed on March 16, 1969; this was following the discontinuance of the last medium distance route to pass through the city, the Reading Railway's Queen of the Valley (Harrisburg–Jersey City). It was destroyed by fire on February 20, 1978.

The station was one of two in Reading, the other being Franklin Street station.

References

External links
 
 

Former Reading Company stations
Railway stations in the United States opened in 1874
Railway stations closed in 1969
Former railway stations in Pennsylvania

Transportation buildings and structures in Berks County, Pennsylvania